Massimiliano Brizzi (born 13 February 1975 in Legnano) is a former Italian footballer who played as a midfielder.

Career
Brizzi played in his country for A.C. Meda 1913, Aurora Pro Patria 1919, Calcio Como, A.C. Lumezzane and Novara Calcio, before in September 2009 moved to Bulgaria, signing a contract with Botev Plovdiv. He made his competitive debut for Botev on 20 September 2009 against Litex Lovech in the sixth round of the A PFG and temporarily retired in January 2010.

References

External links
  Profile at tuttocalciatori.net

1975 births
Living people
Italian footballers
Association football midfielders
Aurora Pro Patria 1919 players
Como 1907 players
F.C. Lumezzane V.G.Z. A.S.D. players
Novara F.C. players
Botev Plovdiv players
Serie C players
Serie D players
First Professional Football League (Bulgaria) players
Expatriate footballers in Bulgaria
A.C. Meda 1913 players
S.G. Gallaratese A.S.D. players